The Tri-State Mall was a shopping mall located on Delaware Route 92 (locally known as "Naamans Road") in Claymont, Delaware. The mall was closed in November 2015. At , it was the state's fourth-biggest mall, with approximately fifty shops. It is located just off of Interstate 95 and is less than a mile from the Pennsylvania/Delaware border. By 2017, the only anchor store left was Burlington Coat Factory with a space previously occupied by Kmart still vacant. A large percentage of shoppers are from Pennsylvania, wishing to take advantage of Delaware's tax free shopping.

History
The mall opened in 1967, featuring Grant City and Wilmington Dry Goods as its anchor stores. The mall housed numerous niche stores, eateries, and other retailers throughout the 1970s and 1980s.  In November 1970 the Cinemagic movie theater opened in the mall.  Grant City became Kmart in 1976, while Wilmington Dry Goods became Value City. Value City closed in 2008 due to the chains bankruptcy and became Burlington Coat Factory.

Residents of nearby New Jersey and Pennsylvania were drawn to the mall due to the lack of sales tax in Delaware as well as its proximity to Interstate 95.  Before Pennsylvania acquired the Powerball lottery game, residents of the state would often travel to the mall's "Tobacco Express" retailer in order to purchase tickets.

Decline
The mall began its decline in the 1990s, as a consequence of the construction of larger malls in Delaware, New Jersey, and Pennsylvania, as well as increased levels of crime in Claymont and its surrounding communities (including the nearby Pennsylvania towns of Chester and Marcus Hook).

The Kmart store closed in early December 2014.

In June 2016, Claymont residents considered ideas for redevelopment of the area, including the mall.

In August 2017, the Burlington Coat Factory relocated to Rocky Run on Concord Pike, leaving no anchors left.

Some time in 2019, the upper level, indoor mall and the main parking lot were taken over by a local manufacturing business that is using the space as a warehouse.  The outdoor lower level is still being used as retail space for several stores as of Jan 2021.

Layout
The mall included a single-level, enclosed building arranged in a cross pattern.  Exterior stairs on the building's eastern end lead to an adjacent strip mall of stores on the lower level of the property's parking lot. As of 2020 there are two vacant anchors last occupied by Burlington Coat Factory and Kmart.

The strip section once included a Silo.

List of anchor stores

References

Shopping malls in Delaware
Defunct shopping malls in the United States
Shopping malls established in 1970
Buildings and structures in New Castle County, Delaware